My Best Friend's Exorcism is a 2022 American supernatural comedy horror film directed by Damon Thomas from a screenplay by Jenna Lamia, based on the 2016 novel of the same name by Grady Hendrix. The film stars Elsie Fisher, Amiah Miller, Rachel Ogechi Kanu, and Cathy Ang. The film was released on Prime Video on September 30, 2022.

Plot
In 1988, high school sophomores Abby Rivers and Gretchen Lang are longtime best friends. Gretchen is moving away with her family over the summer, which saddens Abby, but Gretchen assures her they will always have each other. Together with their friends Margaret Chisholm and Glee Tanaka, Abby and Gretchen spend a weekend at Margaret's family's lake house. One night, they all ingest LSD provided by Margaret's boyfriend Wallace Stoney and, with the exception of Abby, go skinny-dipping in the lake. When Margaret makes an insensitive comment about Abby's acne, Abby walks away, with Gretchen following her to comfort her.

Abby and Gretchen venture into an abandoned shack across the lake where a ritualistic Satanic murder supposedly occurred. Inside, a sinister tree-like creature with a single giant eye scares both girls and they run. Abby finds a way out, while Gretchen is dragged away by an unseen force. Realizing Gretchen is not with her, Abby rushes back to the shack with Margaret and Glee to find Gretchen in a state of shock. Gretchen is upset that Abby abandoned her.

Back at school, Abby worries about Gretchen's uncharacteristically aloof demeanor. During a performance by the Lemon Brothers, a trio of Christian bodybuilders, one of the members, Christian, notices Gretchen's ghoulish appearance. Over the next few days, Gretchen continues to behave erratically, projectile vomiting during lunch and urinating in a trash can while in class.

Abby drives to Gretchen's house to check on her. Gretchen's father does not want her to leave the house, but she ignores him and jumps into Abby's car. As they drive, a distraught Gretchen reveals that ever since "he" (whose name she does not disclose) attacked her at the abandoned shack, "he" has been visiting and watching her every night. She swears Abby to secrecy about this. Abby, assuming that Gretchen was raped, tries to alert both Gretchen's parents and the school headmistress, but they all rebuff her. When Abby suggests to Glee that Wallace raped Gretchen, Margaret accuses Abby of jealousy, while Gretchen scolds her for telling people about her situation. Consequently, Abby is shunned by the other girls.

The school hosts a carnival, where Gretchen humiliates Abby by dunking her in a dunk tank and revealing that she fantasizes about one of their teachers. Abby storms off and Gretchen follows her, attempting to laugh it off, but Abby angrily ends their friendship. The demon possessing Gretchen drives her to self-harm, and later that night, it further torments her. The following day, however, Gretchen walks into class as a completely new person and resumes taunting Abby.

Gretchen proceeds to terrorize Margaret and Glee by exploiting their insecurities. Knowing that Margaret is self-conscious about her weight, Gretchen gives her a diet shake that supposedly inhibits appetite. Margaret gradually becomes ill, until an enormous tapeworm eventually crawls out of her mouth. After manipulating Glee into coming out as a lesbian, Gretchen feeds her a nut-filled brownie, deliberately causing a severe allergic reaction. Margaret and Glee are both hospitalized.

Determined to save her friend, Abby turns to Christian, who confirms Gretchen is possessed and reluctantly agrees to help perform an exorcism. Abby and Christian kidnap Gretchen and tie her to a bed at Margaret's lake house. As Christian sprinkles salt and holy water on Gretchen, Abby says she learned that the demon's name is Andras. The process appears to work until Andras takes the form of Christian's deceased mother. Terrified, Christian abandons Abby halfway through the exorcism.

Gretchen escapes her bonds and attacks Abby, but Abby stabs Gretchen with a fire poker, before Gretchen flees to the abandoned shack where she was possessed. Abby follows, reciting special moments they have shared in order to compel Andras. Gretchen finally vomits out Andras, who emerges as a small skeletal creature and attempts to repossess her. Using an old bottle of liquor and a lighter, Abby sets Andras on fire. Abby and Gretchen embrace.

As Gretchen and her family prepare to move, she and Abby say their goodbyes. While they are unsure if Andras is truly gone, they promise to stay in touch and reaffirm their sisterly love for one another.

Cast

Production
In November 2018, it was announced that Endeavor Content had acquired the film adaptation rights for Hendrix's book. Christopher Landon and Ellen Goldsmith-Vein were announced as producers. Damon Thomas was announced as director. In April 2021, Elsie Fisher, Amiah Miller, Rachel Ogechi Kanu, and Cathy Ang were cast of the film.

Principal photography began in early April 2021 in Georgia.

Reception

References

External links
 

2022 comedy horror films
2020s American films
2020s buddy comedy films
2020s English-language films
2020s female buddy films
2020s high school films
2020s supernatural horror films
2020s teen comedy films
2020s teen horror films
Amazon Prime Video original films
American buddy comedy films
American comedy horror films
American female buddy films
American high school films
American supernatural comedy films
American supernatural horror films
American teen comedy films
American teen horror films
Films about exorcism
Films based on American horror novels
Films set in 1988
Films shot in Georgia (U.S. state)